Tepidanaerobacter syntrophicus  is an anaerobic, moderately thermophilic and syntrophic bacterium from the genus of Tepidanaerobacter which has been isolated from sewage sludge in Niigata in Japan.

References

 

Thermoanaerobacterales
Thermophiles
Anaerobes
Bacteria described in 2006